Rattenbury is a surname. Notable people with the surname include:

Francis Rattenbury (1867–1935), British architect
John Rattenbury (disambiguation), several people
Alma Rattenbury (1897/8–1935), English-Canadian songwriter and accused murderer
Nelson Rattenbury (1907–1973), Canadian businessman and politician
Robert Rattenbury (1901–1970), English classical scholar 
Shane Rattenbury (born 1971), Australian politician